Oliver Charles T Holt (born 22 May 1966) is an English sports journalist who writes for the newspaper The Mail on Sunday in the United Kingdom.  He is the son of Thomas Holt and Coronation Street actress Eileen Derbyshire and is an avid Stockport County supporter. He is known in football journalism circles as the man who embarrasses himself with lazy predictions, but is still well-renowned amongst his peers.

He attended the King's School, Macclesfield from 1977–1984. He then read history at Christ Church, Oxford, before studying newspaper journalism at the Cardiff School of Journalism. He started his journalistic career at the Liverpool Echo, and after three years moved to The Times as Motor Racing Correspondent in 1993. He graduated to Chief Football Writer in 1996 in time to cover England's hosting of the Euro Championships that summer, and then to Chief Sports Correspondent in 2000. Highlights of his time at The Times was covering the 1998 FIFA World Cup and the 2000 Summer Olympics.

He joined the Daily Mirror in 2002 as the Chief Sports Writer, where he has covered many notable sports events. He left the paper in February 2015, to replace Patrick Collins at The Mail on Sunday. Holt was also a regular guest on the Sunday Supplement.

Awards
 2004 the What the Papers Say Best Sports Writer award
 2005 Sports Writer of the Year
 2006 Sports Journalist of the Year

Bibliography
Behind the Scenes with Benetton Formula 1 (1995) with Chris Bennett
The Bridge: Behind the Scenes at Chelsea (1998) with Jon Nicholson
If You're Second You Are Nothing: Ferguson and Shankly (2006)

As Ghost Writer:
Stan: Tackling My Demons by Stan Collymore (2004)
Left Field by Graeme Le Saux (2007)
Made in Sheffield - My Story by Neil Warnock (2007)

References

1966 births
English male journalists
English sportswriters
Living people
The Times people
Journalists from Manchester